The first cabinet of Olof Palme was the cabinet and government of Sweden from 14 October 1969 to 8 October 1976.

Swedish politics during the reign of this cabinet was eventful. During this period, a wave of major strikes broke out and the IB affair, a covert domestic espionage program perpetrated by the state was uncovered. The Norrmalmstorg robbery and subsequent hostage situation took place in 1973, and two years later the West German Embassy siege occurred.

Ministers 

|}

References

Bibliography

Footnotes 

1975 in Sweden

1973 in Sweden

1971 in Sweden

1969 in Sweden

Cabinets of Sweden
1969 establishments in Sweden

1976 in politics

1976 in Sweden
1974 in Sweden
1972 in Sweden
1970 in Sweden
1976 disestablishments in Sweden
1969 in politics
Olof Palme